MSMS may refer to:
 Master of Science in Medical Sciences
 Tandem mass spectrometry (MS/MS)
 Michigan State Medical Society
 Miami Springs Middle School
 Mississippi School for Mathematics and Science 
 Master of Science in Management Studies
 Making Science Make Sense, an outreach program from Bayer Corporation
 MSMs, or men who have sex with men

See also

 MS2 (disambiguation)
 MSM (disambiguation)
 MS (disambiguation)